Manohar Lal Sondhi (1933–2003) was an Indian politician and a member of Lok Sabha. He represented New Delhi constituency in 4th Lok Sabha from 1967 to 1971, elected as a candidate of Bharatiya Jan Sangh. He had his education from Punjab University (MA LLB), London School of Economics, Balliol College Oxford, and Charles University Prague (Czechoslovakia).

He and Balraj Madhok had had many differences over the years with Jana Sangh and BJP leadership, but Vajpayee's NDA government had appointed M L Sondhi as chairman of the Indian Council for Social Science Research.

References

India MPs 1967–1970
Bharatiya Jana Sangh politicians
1933 births
Lok Sabha members from Delhi
Indian civil servants
2003 deaths
Charles University alumni